Athletics competitions at the 2002 Micronesian Games were held at the Pohnpei State Track and Field in Kolonia, Pohnpei, between July 22–26, 2002.

A total of 35 events were contested, 19 by men and 16 by women.

Medal summary
Medal winners and their results were published on the Athletics Weekly webpage
courtesy of Tony Isaacs.

Men

Women

Medal table (unofficial)

References

Athletics at the Micronesian Games
Athletics in the Federated States of Micronesia
Micronesian Games
Micro